The blackish white-toothed shrew (Crocidura nigricans) is a species of mammal in the family Soricidae. It is endemic to Angola.

References

Mammals of Angola
Crocidura
Endemic fauna of Angola
Mammals described in 1889
Taxonomy articles created by Polbot